Praca and variants may refer to:

 Prača (river), a river in Bosnia and Herzegovina
 Prača (Pale-Prača), a village in Federation of Bosnia and Herzegovina, Bosnia and Herzegovina
 Prača (Dimitrovgrad), a village in Serbia
 Praca, Łódź Voivodeship, a village in Łódź Voivodeship in central Poland